Marclei César Chaves Santos (born 18 June 1989), is a Brazilian footballer who plays as a striker. Currently plays for Dukagjini in the Football Superleague of Kosovo.

Career
He started his professionally career in the Campeonato Brasileiro Série B in 2011 where he played for Boa.

Mitra Kukar
Previously, Marclei played for the Brazilian club side Bahia de Feira. His contract with the club actually only ends in May 2017. But because of the offer from Indonesian club side Mitra Kukar, he immediately ended his contract with Bahia de Feira as of 10 April 2017.

Al-Salmiya SC
On 2 February 2019, Marclei confirmed on his Instagram profile, that he had joined Al-Salmiya.

FC Feronikeli 74
After a brief return to Bahia de Feira, Marclei moved to Kosovan club Feronikeli in August 2020.

FC Prishtina
Santos moved to most famous Kosovan club FC Prishtina in July 2022.

Honours
Boa Esporte
Campeonato Mineiro Módulo II Winner: 2011

Mixto

Campeonato Mato-Grossense Runner-up: 2013

Ríver 
Campeonato Piauiense Winner: 2014

References

External links

Marclei Santos at ZeroZero

1989 births
Living people
Brazilian footballers
Brazilian expatriate footballers
Votoraty Futebol Clube players
Santa Helena Esporte Clube players
G.D. Sagrada Esperança players
Esporte Clube Vitória players
Boa Esporte Clube players
Club Sportivo Sergipe players
Mixto Esporte Clube players
Anápolis Futebol Clube players
River Atlético Clube players
Esporte Clube Jacuipense players
Associação Desportiva Bahia de Feira players
Mitra Kukar players
Marclei Santos
União Esporte Clube players
Ho Chi Minh City FC players
Al Salmiya SC players
CE Operário Várzea-Grandense players
KF Feronikeli players
Liga 1 (Indonesia) players
Marclei Santos
V.League 1 players
Campeonato Brasileiro Série B players
Campeonato Brasileiro Série D players
Kuwait Premier League players
Association football forwards
Brazilian expatriate sportspeople in Indonesia
Brazilian expatriate sportspeople in Thailand
Brazilian expatriate sportspeople in Vietnam
Brazilian expatriate sportspeople in Kuwait
Brazilian expatriate sportspeople in Kosovo
Expatriate footballers in Indonesia
Expatriate footballers in Thailand
Expatriate footballers in Vietnam
Expatriate footballers in Kuwait
Expatriate footballers in Kosovo